The 2022–23 season is Maccabi Haifa's 65th season in the Israeli Premier League, and their 41st consecutive season in the top division of Israeli football.

On 23 August, the club achieved qualification to the UEFA Champions League group stage for the third time in their history after a 2–2 draw with Red Star Belgrade that saw them advance 5–4 on aggregate.

Squad

Squad information

Transfers

Transfers in

Transfers out

Loans in

Loans return

Loans out

Pre-season and friendlies

Competitions

Overview

Ligat Ha'Al

Regular season

Regular season table

Matches

Results overview

Championship round

Championship round table

Matches

Results overview

Overall

Results summary

Results by round

State Cup

Toto Cup

5–6th classification match

Israel Super Cup

UEFA Champions League

Second qualifying round

Third qualifying round

Play-off round

Group stage

Statistics

Squad statistics

Goals

Clean sheets

Disciplinary record for Ligat Ha'Al and State Cup

Disciplinary record for UEFA Champions League

Suspensions

Penalties

Overall

Notes

References

External links
 Maccabi Haifa website 

Maccabi Haifa F.C. seasons
Maccabi Haifa
2022–23 UEFA Champions League participants seasons